A variety of ancient higher-learning institutions were developed in many cultures to provide institutional frameworks for scholarly activities. These ancient centres were sponsored and overseen by courts; by religious institutions, which sponsored cathedral schools, monastic schools, and madrasas; by scientific institutions, such as museums, hospitals, and observatories; and by respective scholars.  They are to be distinguished from the Western-style university, an autonomous organization of scholars that originated in medieval Europe and has been adopted in other regions in modern times (see list of oldest universities in continuous operation).

Africa

North Africa

Egypt

 Ancient Egyptians established an organization of higher learning – the  Per-ankh, which means the “House of Life” – in 2000 BCE.

In the 3rd century BCE, amid the Ptolemaic dynasty, the Serapeum, Mouseion, and Library of Alexandria served as organizations of higher learning in Alexandria.

In Cairo, Al-Azhar, which was established in 970 CE, served as an organization of higher learning.

Morocco

In  Fez, Fatima al-Fihri established a mosque in 859 CE, which eventually became the organization of higher learning, the University of al-Qarawiyyin.

Tunisia

The Ez-Zitouna University, which was established in 732 CE, served as an organization of higher learning.

West Africa

Mali

In the 12th century CE, the University of Sankore, which began as the Mosque of Sankore, served as an organization of higher learning in Timbuktu. The Mosque of Sankore, the Mosque of Sidi Yahya, and the Mosque of Djinguereber constitute what is referred to as the University of Timbuktu.

East Africa

Ethiopia

In the 4th century CE, amid the reign of Emperor Ella Amida, the Axumite imperial church served as an organization of higher learning.

Asia

Ancient India  
Major Buddhist monasteries (mahaviharas), notably those at Pushpagiri, Nalanda, Valabhi, and Taxila, included schools that were some of the primary institutions of higher learning in ancient India.

Nalanda

Nalanda was established in the fifth century AD in Bihar, India and survived until circa 1200 AD. It was devoted to Buddhist studies, but it also trained students in fine arts, medicine, mathematics, astronomy, politics and the art of war.

The center had eight separate compounds, ten temples, meditation halls, classrooms, lakes and parks. It had a nine-story library with 9 million books where monks meticulously copied books and documents so that individual scholars could have their own collections. It had dormitories for students, housing 10,000 students in the school's heyday and providing accommodation for 2,000 professors. Nalanda attracted pupils and scholars from Sri Lanka, Korea, Japan, China, Tibet, Indonesia, Persia and Turkey, who left accounts of the center.

Evidence in literature suggests that in 1193, the Nalanda University was sacked by Bakhtiyar Khilji. The Persian historian Minhaj-i-Siraj, in his chronicle the Tabaqat-i-Nasiri, reported an attack on a Buddhist monastery in which all the monks and many Hindus were killed. This may have been Nalanda but others believe it was Odantapuri. 
In 2014 a modern Nalanda University was launched in nearby Rajgir.

Pushpagiri

The school in Pushpagiri was established in the 3rd century AD as present Odisha, India. As of 2007, the ruins of this Mahavihara had not yet been fully excavated. Consequently, much of the Mahavihara's history remains unknown. Of the three Mahavihara campuses, Lalitgiri in the district of Cuttack is the oldest. Iconographic analysis indicates that Lalitgiri had already been established during the Shunga period of the 2nd century BC, making it one of the oldest Buddhist establishments in the world. The Chinese traveller Xuanzang (Hiuen Tsang), who visited it in AD 639, as Puphagiri Mahavihara, as well as in medieval Tibetan texts. However, unlike Takshila and Nalanda, the ruins of Pushpagiri were not discovered until 1995, when a lecturer from a local college first stumbled upon the site. It is now being carried out by the Archaeological Survey of India (ASI).
The Nagarjunakonda inscriptions also mention about this learning center.

Taxila
Ancient Taxila or Takshashila, in ancient Gandhara, was an early Hindu and Buddhist centre of learning. According to scattered references that were only fixed a millennium later, it may have dated back to at least the fifth century BC. Some scholars date Takshashila's existence back to the sixth century BC. The school consisted of several monasteries without large dormitories or lecture halls where the religious instruction was most likely still provided on an individualistic basis.

Takshashila is described in some detail in later Jātaka tales, written in Sri Lanka around the fifth century AD.

It became a noted centre of learning at least several centuries BC, and continued to attract students until the destruction of the city in the fifth century AD. Takshashila is perhaps best known because of its association with Chanakya. The famous treatise Arthashastra (Sanskrit for The knowledge of Economics) by Chanakya, is said to have been composed in Takshashila itself. Chanakya (or Kautilya), the Maurya Emperor Chandragupta and the Ayurvedic healer Charaka studied at Taxila.

Generally, a student entered Takshashila at the age of sixteen. The Vedas and the Eighteen Arts, which included skills such as archery, hunting, and elephant lore, were taught, in addition to its law school, medical school, and school of military science.

Vikramashila 
Vikramashila was one of the two most important centres of learning in India during the Pala Empire, along with Nalanda. Vikramashila was established by King Dharmapala (783 to 820) in response to a supposed decline in the quality of scholarship at Nalanda. Atisha, the renowned pandita, is sometimes listed as a notable abbot. It was destroyed by the forces of Muhammad bin Bakhtiyar Khilji around 1200.

Vikramashila is known to us mainly through Tibetan sources, especially the writings of Tāranātha, the Tibetan monk historian of the 16th–17th centuries.

Vikramashila was one of the largest Buddhist universities, with more than one hundred teachers and about one thousand students.  It produced eminent scholars who were often invited by foreign countries to spread Buddhist learning, culture and religion. The most distinguished and eminent among all was Atisha Dipankara, a founder of the Sarma traditions of Tibetan Buddhism. Subjects like philosophy, grammar, metaphysics, Indian logic etc. were taught here, but the most important branch of learning was tantrism.

Mithila University 
University of Mithila was famous for Nyaya Sutra and logical Sciences. It was gradually started from the philosophical conferences held by Janaka, the king of Mithila at his court. These philosophical conferences led to the formation of a seat of learning and this seat of learning converted into the university of Mithila.

Other 
Further centres include Odantapuri, in Bihar (circa 550 - 1040), Telhara in Bihar (probably older than Nalanda), Somapura Mahavihara and Jagaddala Mahavihara, in Bengal (from the Pala period to the Turkic Muslim conquest), Kanchipuram, in Tamil Nadu, Manyakheta, in Karnataka, Nagarjunakonda, in Andhra Pradesh, Sharada Peeth, Somapura Mahavihara, in Bangladesh (from the Gupta period to the Turkic Muslim conquest), Valabhi, in Gujarat (from the Maitrak period to the Arab raids), Varanasi in Uttar Pradesh (eighth century to modern times), Vikramashila, in Bihar (circa 800–1040), Mahavihara, Abhayagiri Vihāra, and Jetavanaramaya, in Sri Lanka.

East Asia

China 
In China, the ancient imperial academy known as Taixue was established by the Han Dynasty. It was intermittently inherited by succeeding Chinese dynasties up until the Qing dynasty, in some of which the name was changed to Guozixue or Guozijian. Peking University (Imperial University of Peking) and Nanjing University are regarded as the replacement of Taixue. By 725 AD, Shuyuan or Academies of Classical Learning were private learning institutions established during the medieval Chinese Tang dynasty. The Yuelu Academy (later become Hunan University) founded in 976 AD, which is one of the four ancient famous Shuyuan (Academies) during the Song dynasty.

Japan 
In Japan, Daigakuryo was founded in 671 and Ashikaga Gakko was founded in the 9th century and restored in 1432.

Korea 
In Korea, Taehak was founded in 372 and Gukhak was established in 682. Seowons were private institutions established during the Joseon dynasty which combined functions of a Confucian shrine and a preparatory school. The Seonggyungwan was founded by in 1398 to offer prayers and memorials to Confucius and his disciples, and to promote the study of the Confucian canon. It was the successor to Gukjagam from the Goryeo Dynasty (992). It was reopened as Sungkyunkwan University, a private Western-style university, in 1946.

Ancient Persia 
The Academy of Gondishapur was established in the 3rd century AD under the rule of Sassanid kings and continued its scholarly activities up to four centuries after Islam came to Iran. It was an important medical centre of the 6th and 7th centuries and a prominent example of higher education model in pre-Islam Iran. When the Platonic Academy in Athens was closed in 529, some of its pagan scholars went to Gundishahpur, although they returned within a year to Byzantium.

Europe

Classical Greece 

The Platonic Academy (sometimes referred to as the University of Athens), founded ca. 387 BCE in Athens, Greece, by the philosopher Plato, lasted until 86 BCE, when it was destroyed during Sulla's siege and sacking of Athens. Some 400 years later, during the fourth century CE, the Platonist philosopher Plutarch of Athens started a school which identified itself with Plato's Academy. That school lasted until 529, when it was closed following an edict from the Emperor Justinian prohibiting pagans from teaching. The Academy was also emulated during the Renaissance by the Florentine Platonic Academy, whose members saw themselves as following Plato's tradition.

Around 335 BCE, Plato's successor Aristotle founded the Peripatetic school, the students of which met at the Lyceum gymnasium in Athens. The school also ceased in 86 BC during the famine, siege and sacking of Athens by Sulla.

The reputation of the Greek institutions was such that at least four central modern educational terms derive from them: the academy, the lyceum, the gymnasium and the museum.

Christian Europe 

The University of Constantinople, founded as an institution of higher learning in 425, educated graduates to take on posts of authority in the imperial service or within the Church. It was reorganized as a corporation of students in 849 by the regent Bardas of emperor Michael III, is considered by some to be the earliest institution of higher learning with some of the characteristics we associate today with a university (research and teaching, auto-administration, academic independence, et cetera). If a university is defined as "an institution of higher learning" then it is preceded by several others, including the Academy that it was founded to compete with and eventually replaced. If the original meaning of the word is considered "a corporation of students" then this could be the first example of such an institution.  The Preslav Literary School and Ohrid Literary School were the two major literary schools of the First Bulgarian Empire.

In Western Europe during the Early Middle Ages, bishops sponsored cathedral schools and monasteries sponsored monastic schools, chiefly dedicated to the education of clergy. The earliest evidence of a European episcopal school is that established in Visigothic Spain at the Second Council of Toledo in 527. These early episcopal schools, with a focus on an apprenticeship in religious learning under a scholarly bishop, have been identified in Spain and in about twenty towns in Gaul during the 6th and 7th centuries.

In addition to these episcopal schools, there were monastic schools which educated monks and nuns, as well as future bishops, at a more advanced level. Around the turn of the 12th and 13th centuries, some of them developed into autonomous universities.  A notable example is when the University of Paris grew out of the schools associated with the Cathedral of Notre Dame, the Monastery of Ste. Geneviève, and the Abbey of St. Victor.

See also 
 Madrasah
 Medieval university
 Nezamiyeh
 History of Academia, Academy, University
Pirivena

References 
 
 
 
 Riché, Pierre. Education and Culture in the Barbarian West: From the Sixth through the Eighth Century. Columbia: University of South Carolina Press, 1978.  .

Notes

External links 
 Ancient Buddhist Monastic Establishments in Bangladesh